Michael Klein (10 October 1959 – 2 February 1993) was a Romanian footballer who played as a left-back.

Club career
Michael Klein, nicknamed Mișa, was born on 10 October 1959 in Amnaș, Romania, being half of Transylvanian Saxon origin from his father side. He started to play football at Corvinul Hunedoara's youth center in 1973, making his debut for the senior team on 24 August 1977 under coach Ștefan Coidum in a Divizia A match which ended 2–2 against Argeș Pitești. In the following season he was sent on a loan at Divizia B team, Aurul Brad, but in the 1978–79 Divizia A season he was brought back to Corvinul by the team's new coach, Mircea Lucescu. At the end of Klein and Lucescu's first season spent at Corvinul Hunedoara, the club relegated to Divizia B, but Klein stayed with the club, promoting back to the first division after one year, helping the club finish 3rd in the 1981–82 Divizia A, also appearing in four games in which he scored one goal in the 1982–83 UEFA Cup. After 11 seasons and a half spent with Corvinul Hunedoara in which he scored 37 goals in 313 league games, in the middle of the 1988–89 season he was transferred at Dinamo București where he reunited with his former Corvinul Hunedoara manager, Mircea Lucescu. In his first season spent with The Red Dogs, he didn't win any trophies and he played two games in the 1988–89 European Cup Winners' Cup where the club reached the quarter-finals. In the following season the club won the title and the cup with Klein playing 23 Divizia A matches in which he scored two goals, also appearing in 7 matches in which he scored one goal in the 1989–90 European Cup Winners' Cup where Dinamo București reached the semi-finals. After the 1989 Romanian Revolution, Klein went to play in Germany for Bayer Uerdingen where in his first season the team relegated to 2. Bundesliga, but he stayed with the club winning the promotion back to Bundesliga. On 2 February 1993, Klein died of a heart attack during a training session with Bayer Uerdingen at the age of 33. Michael Klein has a total of 322 matches and 36 goals scored in Divizia A, 37 matches in Bundesliga, 25 games in 2. Bundesliga and 13 games played with two goals scored in European competitions. The Stadionul Michael Klein from Hunedoara is named in his honor, also in front of the stadium there is a statue of Michael Klein. A book about him was written by Nicolae Stanciu, called Klein, căpitanul lui Lucescu. Cronici sentimentale (Klein, Lucescu's captain. Sentimental chronicles).

International career
Michael Klein played 89 matches and scored five goals at international level for the Romania national team, making his debut on 9 September 1981 when coach Valentin Stănescu sent him on the field in the 49th minute in order to replace Aurel Beldeanu in a friendly which ended with a 2–1 loss against Bulgaria. His following appearance was a 0–0 against Switzerland at the 1982 World Cup qualifiers and he scored his first two goals in a friendly which ended with a 3–2 victory against Chile. He made seven appearances at the successful Euro 1984 qualifiers in which he scored one goal in a 2–0 victory against Sweden, being used by coach Mircea Lucescu in all the minutes of the three matches from the final tournament as Romania did not pass the group stage. He played seven games at the 1986 World Cup qualifiers, six matches with one goal scored in a 1–0 away victory against Albania at the Euro 1988 qualifiers and made five appearances at the successful 1990 World Cup qualifiers, being used by coach Emerich Jenei in all the minutes of the four matches from the final tournament, as Romania got eliminated by Ireland in the eight-finals. Michael Klein played six games at the Euro 1992 qualifiers and in the last one of them, he made his final appearance for the national team which took place on 13 November 1991 in a 1–0 victory against Switzerland.

Career statistics
Scores and results list Romania's goal tally first, score column indicates score after each Klein goal.

Honours
Corvinul Hunedoara
Divizia B: 1979–80
Dinamo București
Divizia A: 1989–90
Cupa României: 1989–90
Bayer Uerdingen
2. Bundesliga: 1991–92

References

External links

1959 births
1993 deaths
People from Săliște
Romanian footballers
Romania international footballers
Romanian expatriate footballers
FC Dinamo București players
KFC Uerdingen 05 players
CS Corvinul Hunedoara players
1990 FIFA World Cup players
UEFA Euro 1984 players
Romanian people of German descent
Bundesliga players
2. Bundesliga players
Liga I players
Liga II players
Expatriate footballers in Germany
Association football defenders
Association football players who died while playing
Sport deaths in Germany
Romanian expatriate sportspeople in Germany
Transylvanian Saxon people